Chozhia Vellalar (also spelt as Sozhia Vellalar)  is a caste from the Indian state of Tamil Nadu. The Chozhia Vellalars along-with Keerakarars, Kodikalarars and Vatrilaikarars is a sub-caste of the greater Vellalars.

Distribution and migration
The Sozhiya Vellalars were present predominantly in the delta districts of Tamil Nadu - Trichy, Thanjavur, Karur, Namakkal, Mannargudi, Nagappattinam. Nowadays they are present in almost all the districts of Tamil Nadu.

Though the distribution of the community is found in most of the districts, they migrated to the other parts of Tamil Nadu from Trichy and Thanjavur areas towards the middle and second half of the 19th century. As they moved in, they always followed the river bed areas for settlement. Thus, the said community when came to Salem District they initially settled at Palamedu. When their life at Palamedu became difficult due to Theechati Kolliyars (Dacoits with fire) they moved out. Of these the persons who moved to Pandamangalam area were farmers and the traders moved into Proper Salem. They settled as trader dealing in betel leaves and thus earning the name Vatrilaikarar.

Present status 
In the state of Tamil Nadu they are classified as Other Backward Class under India's Reservation system.

Sri Lanka

The Vellalars of Sri Lanka have been chronicled in the Yalpana Vaipava Malai and other historical texts of the Jaffna kingdom. They form half of the Sri Lankan Tamil population and are the major husbandmen, involved in tillage and cattle cultivation. Local Sri Lankan literature, such as the Kailiyai Malai, an account on Kalinga Magha, narrates the migration of Vellala Nattar chiefs from the Coromandel Coast to Sri Lanka. The Kings of Jaffna married among the Vellalas.

References

See also
List of Vellalar sub castes

Vellalar
Social groups of Tamil Nadu